The 1978–79 Nationalliga A season was the 41st season of the Nationalliga A, the top level of ice hockey in Switzerland. Eight teams participated in the league, and SC Bern won the championship.

Standings

External links 
 Championnat de Suisse 1978/79

Swiss
National League (ice hockey) seasons
1978–79 in Swiss ice hockey